Creature with the Atom Brain is a 1955 American zombie horror science fiction film directed by Edward L. Cahn and starring Richard Denning.

American gangster Frank Buchanan (Michael Granger) forces former Nazi scientist Wilhelm Steigg (Gregory Gaye) to create zombies by resurrecting corpses through atomic radiation in order to help him exact revenge on his enemies.

Creature with the Atom Brain was released as the bottom half of a double feature with It Came from Beneath the Sea.

Plot
A hulking zombie breaks into a mansion and kills a gangster named Hennesy. The bloodstains left behind at the crime scene are radioactive, and the killer's fingerprints are of a man who had died days before the murder; the police are baffled.

Crime boss Frank Buchanan, who had been forced to flee the United States before he was deported, was betrayed by his own underworld gang members. While traveling in Europe, he finds ex-Nazi scientist Wilhelm Steigg (Gaye) trying to reanimate the dead to provide a menial labor pool that is easily exploited. Buchanan funds the research and brings the scientist to America with the unstated goal of sending Steigg's zombies out to murder those who ousted him; one by one, they are killed in the same fashion.

The police eventually discover the common connection between the murdered gang members and Buchanan. They try to put the remaining three into protective custody, but Buchanan uses a reanimated dead cop to kill one of them and a reanimated dead police captain to kill the remaining two. When the zombie captain is captured, police doctor Dr. Chet Walker (Denning) discovers an atomic-powered remote control brain implant and deduces what has been going on.  When the zombie captain returns to Buchanan's hideout, they follow him.

When the police and army troops converge on Buchanan's lead-lined mansion, he kills Steigg and then sends out his unkillable zombies to battle them. Walker, however, is able to get into the mansion, but Buchanan attacks Walker and tries to shoot him. The still-animated zombie police captain breaks in and grabs and strangles Buchanan before he can fire a shot. Walker then smashes the atomic-powered equipment that controls the zombies; after doing so, they all collapse.

Cast
 Richard Denning as Dr. Chet Walker
 Angela Stevens as Joyce Walker
 S. John Launer as Capt. Dave Harris 
 Michael Granger as Frank Buchanan 
 Gregory Gaye as Dr. Wilhelm Steigg (as Gregory Gay)
 Linda Bennett as Penny Walker 
 Tristram Coffin as District Atty. McGraw
 Harry Lauter as Reporter #1
 Larry J. Blake as Reporter #2 (as Larry Blake)
 Charles Evans as Chief Camden 
 Pierre Watkin as Mayor Bremer
 Lane Chandler as Gen. Saunders (uncredited)

Production
The film was made by Sam Katzman's Clover Productions for Columbia Pictures Corp.

Reception
In The Zombie Movie Encyclopedia, academic Peter Dendle wrote, "Good '50s fun abounds, with all the twisted gender ideology and antiseptic social ideals that that implies, packed in a tightly-wrought action film with strong (if entertainingly dated) conceptual support".  David Maine of PopMatters rated it 6 out of 10 stars and called it "a thoroughly enjoyable, noir-ish SF chiller, if you can get past the dingbat wife and cutie-pie kid".

Home media
Sony Pictures Home Entertainment released the film on Region 1 DVD in October 2007 as part of the two-disc, four-film set, Icons of Horror Collection: Sam Katzman, which also included these Katzman-produced films: The Werewolf, The Giant Claw, and Zombies of Mora Tau.

Shown on the MeTV show Svengoolie on Dec 10, 2022.

Influence
Roky Erickson and the Aliens, a band whose lyrics often riffed on old horror and science fiction movies, recorded a song titled "Creature with the Atom Brain" in 1980. This song, in turn, became the namesake of the Belgian rock band Creature with the Atom Brain. In addition, The Celibate Rifles released a song titled "Return of the Creature with the Atom Brain". 

Director Cahn would go on to make Invisible Invaders (1959) using the same basic concept (in the later film, invading aliens inhabit the reanimated corpses of humans).

See also
List of American films of 1955

References

Bibliography
 Warren, Bill. Keep Watching the Skies: American Science Fiction Films of the Fifties, 21st Century Edition. Jefferson, North Carolina: McFarland & Company, 2009 (First Edition 1982). .

External links

 
 

1955 films
American black-and-white films
1950s science fiction horror films
1955 horror films
Films directed by Edward L. Cahn
Films with screenplays by Curt Siodmak
Columbia Pictures films
American films about revenge
American science fiction horror films
American zombie films
Nazi zombie films
1950s English-language films
American exploitation films
1950s American films